Dimitar Ivanov may refer to:

 Dimitar Ivanov Stoyanov (1878–1949), Bulgarian writer Elin Pelin
 Dimitar Ivanov Popov (1894–1975), Bulgarian organic chemist
 Dimitar Ivanov (footballer, born 1970), Bulgarian footballer and manager
 Dimitar Ivanov (canoeist) (born 1975), Bulgarian sprint canoer